Two Tracts on Government is a work of political philosophy written in 1660 by John Locke but remained unpublished until 1961. It bears a similar name to a later, more famous, political philosophy work by Locke, namely Two Treatises of Government. The two works, however, have very different positions.

Structure
The work comprises two articles.

The first article is in English, entitled Question: whether the Civil Magistrate may lawfully impose and determine the use of indifferent things in Religious Worship, to which Locke replies affirmatively.
The article is largely an attempt to refute Edward Bagshaw’s The Great Question Concerning Things Indifferent in Religious Worship, published a year earlier and advocating religious toleration.

The second article, in Latin, is entitled . In this article Locke elaborates on the concepts of law and authority upon which the first article is based.

Historical background

Between 1642 and 1651 England suffered several armed conflicts known as the English Civil War. These conflicts arose around religious tensions and questions of the King's right to rule. Locke, growing up in such an atmosphere and influenced by earlier writers such as Thomas Hobbes, feared liberty could lead to civil disturbance.

Tension between authoritarian and liberal views can be found already in this work. A few years later, Locke co-authored the Fundamental Constitutions of Carolina, which promise religious toleration, but establish aristocracy, slavery and serfdom. In fact Locke himself became financially involved in slave trade during those years. Only later in his life did Locke come to endorse the liberalism he is known for.

References

Works by John Locke
Books in political philosophy
Political books
1660 books